General elections were held in Turkey on Sunday, 18 April 1999. For the first time, local, council and parliamentary elections were held on the same day. Bülent Ecevit's Democratic Left Party (DSP) had been soaring in popularity after the capture of Kurdistan Worker's Party (PKK) leader Abdullah Öcalan, emerged as the biggest party and swept the board in most of Turkey's western provinces. It failed, however, to obtain an overall majority, and did not do nearly as well in the eastern provinces.

The second largest party (dubbed "the second winner" by the press the following day) became the Nationalist Movement Party (MHP), which performed strongly nationwide, producing MPs from nearly all of the country's 81 provinces. The largest party of the last election, the Virtue Party (FP), returned to opposition after shedding forty-seven seats and a million votes. The decline of the Republican People's Party continued; this was the first and the only time in the history of the republic when the party failed to cross the 10 percent threshold for parliamentary representation. This was the last election which produced a hung parliament until the June 2015 general election.

Background 
During the 1997 Turkish military memorandum, in case the Welfare Party were to be banned, the Virtue Party was founded in December 1997. The Welfare Party was subsequently banned in January 1998.

Results

Aftermath
Bülent Ecevit formed the country's latest coalition government, against the FP, with the second-placed MHP and the fourth-placed Motherland Party (ANAP) as a junior partner. The DYP was consulted during coalition negotiations, but ended up in opposition. The DSP–MHP–ANAP coalition turned out to be one of the most stable in many years, surviving without change until Ecevit's hospitalisation and subsequent refusal to resign in 2002 prompted a wave of resignations from the DSP and early general elections. Five parties in the parliament (DSP, MHP, FP, ANAP and DYP) all failed to gain seats in 2002 elections.

References

General elections in Turkey
Turkey
Turkey
General
April 1999 events in Turkey